Elana James (born Elana Jaime Fremerman, October 21, 1970, Kansas City, Missouri, United States) is an American songwriter, Western swing, folk and jazz violinist, vocalist, and a founding member of the band Hot Club of Cowtown.

Biography
James grew up in Prairie Village, Kansas, a suburb of Kansas City, Missouri, and began studying Suzuki violin at age four. Her mother, Susan, is a professional violinist who used to play in the Kansas City Symphony and her father, Marvin, ran a commercial recording studio and was the creative director and founder of an advertising agency in Kansas City.

James grew up riding her horse, April, and playing violin in Kansas before leaving for New York City at age 17. In 1992 she graduated cum laude with a  B.A. in Comparative Religion from Barnard College, Columbia University, in New York City (with a focus on Buddhism and Hinduism) while studying violin and viola at the Manhattan School of Music as a student of Lucie Robert and Karen Ritscher.  She studied improvisation and swing fiddle with Marty Laster in New York City and studied Dhrupad, an early form of North Indian Classical music, with Pandit Vidhur Malik in Vrindavan, India.

James is a former managing editor of Tricycle: The Buddhist Review and a former editorial intern at Harper's Magazine. In the early 1990s she worked as a horse wrangler at the Home Ranch in Clark, Colorado where she also played fiddle in the ranch's cowboy band. James also worked occasionally as a packer and horse wrangler in the West Elk and La Garita Wilderness in Colorado in the mid-1990s, punctuated by brief stints in publishing in New York City. James is an alumnus of the Meadowmount School of Music, the New York Youth Symphony, the Columbia University Chamber Music Program, the New York String Orchestra Seminar with Alexander Schneider and the American Conservatory in Fontainebleau, France.

Musical career
Elana James met guitarist Whit Smith in 1994 through an ad in the Village Voice while both were living in New York City. They played together for some years, later adding Jake Erwin, a slap bass player, and forming the American swing trio Hot Club of Cowtown. The group plays original material as well as a mix of pre-WWII Western swing, a style made famous by Bob Wills and Milton Brown, combined with the Gypsy jazz of guitarist Django Reinhardt and violinist Stephane Grappelli. Other influences include American swing violinists Stuff Smith, Joe Venuti, and Johnny Gimble. Hot Club of Cowtown, which has been based in Austin, Texas since 1998, is not named for any specific "Cowtown," but is rather just intended as state of mind, or "The Cowtown of the Imagination."

James toured with Bob Dylan in 2004, 2005, and 2006 (James came to Dylan's attention when The Hot Club of Cowtown opened for him and Willie Nelson during a joint tour of historic baseball parks in the Summer of 2004). She briefly joined Dylan's band in 2005 on a tour with Merle Haggard, Bob Dylan, and Amos Lee, as the first dedicated female instrumentalist to play in Dylan's touring band since Scarlet Rivera in the early 1970s.

The Hot Club of Cowtown briefly separated in 2005. Around this time, Fremerman changed her name to Elana James and released her debut album, Elana James, forming a trio called Elana James and the Continental Two with Beau Sample on bass and Luke Hill on guitar. She joined Dylan again in 2006 as his opening act on another historic ballparks tour also featuring Junior Brown and Jimmie Vaughan.

From 2005 through 2008, James led her trio and performed in one with Cindy Cashdollar and Redd Volkaert as the High Flyers, appearing on A Prairie Home Companion and in clubs in Austin. During this time James also performed with Heybale, a group including Redd Volkaert, Earl Poole Ball, Tom Lewis, Kevin Smith and Gary Claxton.

In 2008, The Hot Club of Cowtown, with James, guitarist Whit Smith and bassist Jake Erwin re-formed, and continued touring and recording. In 2008, the band released The Best of the Hot Club of Cowtown, followed by Wishful Thinking in 2009, and in 2011, a collection of Western swing songs made popular by legendary Texas bandleader Bob Wills, What Makes Bob Holler. The Hot Club of Cowtown's most recent albums include Rendezvous in Rhythm (Gold Strike Records, 2013), a collection of hot jazz standards and traditional Romanian-style instrumentals performed acoustically, in the style of Django Reinhardt and Stephane Grappelli; Midnight on the Trail, a compilation of early Western swing and cowboy songs; "Crossing the Great Divide," a 7-track EP of songs written by The Band on the occasion of the 50th anniversary of the release of Music from Big Pink and The Band; and Wild Kingdom, an album of original material released on September 27, 2019.

James has worked in the Bob Marshall and Lee Metcalf Wilderness of Montana as a wrangler, packer, cook, and guide. In 2019 she was named one of two Packer Apprentices with the Bob Marshall Wilderness Foundation for the summer season, learning and applying the mule-packing style. She has taught music privately, leads fiddle workshops, and released an instructional video, Elana James's Hot Fiddle: Introduction to Violin Improvisation.

James's second solo album, Black Beauty (Snarf, 2015), is a collection of eclectic folk and pop songs and original material. In The Wall Street Journal article including Black Beauty as one of the "Six Retro Roots Albums to Jump Start Your Summer." Barry Mazor wrote, "Ms. James is more a singing, swinging Grappelli- and Venuti-influenced violinist than a breakdown fiddler, which serves her well on this set. Her smooth, sweet string-vocal combination is applied—along with jazz piano here, steel guitar there—to material ranging from the Grateful Dead's 'Ripple' to Goebel Reeves's 'Hobo's Lullaby' and the Peggy Lee/Benny Goodman 'All I Need Is You.' Genre distinctions collapse. The rootsier songs all become entries in the jazzy Great American Songbook."

James has been a guest on A Prairie Home Companion, the Grand Ole Opry, the Women in Jazz series at Jazz at Lincoln Center, and at festivals and concerts throughout the world, including the Glastonbury Festival in England, the Fuji Rock Festival in Japan, Australia's East Coast Blues & Roots Music Festival, the Rochester Jazz Festival, Hardly Strictly Bluegrass Festival, the Kennedy Center Millennium Stage and the Cambridge Folk Festival.

Awards and honors
In 2013 she was nominated in the Western Swing Female category for the first Ameripolitan Music Awards in Austin, Texas. In February 2015 James was named Western Swing Female 2015 at the Ameripolitan Music Awards. In 2015 the Hot Club of Cowtown also won for Best Western Swing Group at the second annual Ameripolitan Music Awards at the Paramount Theater in Austin, Texas. On October 6, 2019, James is honored to be inducted into the Sacramento Western Swing Society's Hall of Fame.

In 2004 she was inducted, with her Hot Club bandmates, into the Texas Western Swing Hall of Fame. James has recorded with a wide array of folk, country, and Americana artists including Bob Dylan, Merle Haggard, Willie Nelson, Slaid Cleaves, Denny Freeman, Dave Stuckey, Eliza Gilkyson, Heybale, Tom Russell, The Hoyle Brothers, Kerry Polk, Beatroot, Bruce Anfinson, and many others. She and Hot Club Of Cowtown appeared on "Larry's Country Diner" on RFD-TV in July 2019.

Discography

Solo
 Elana James (Snarf, 2007)
 Black Beauty (Snarf, 2015)

With the Hot Club of Cowtown
 Tall Tales (HighTone, 1999)
 Dev'lish Mary (HighTone, 2000)
 Continental Stomp (HighTone, 2003)
 Wishful Thinking (Gold Strike, 2009) 
 Western Clambake (Gold Strike, 2017) 
 Crossing the Great Divide (Gold Strike, 2019)

References

External links
Elana James' official homepage
Hot Club of Cowtown's official homepage

American jazz violinists
Living people
1970 births
21st-century American singers
21st-century American women singers
21st-century American violinists